Arheilgen is a district in the north of the city of Darmstadt in Hesse, Germany, incorporated in 1937.
Arheilgen borders the Darmstadt district of Wixhausen to the North, to the West is the city Weiterstadt, to the East is the Darmstadt district Kranichstein, to the South is the city center of Darmstadt.

History
 
The actual settlement probably began in the second half of the first millennium, when a number of Frankish settlements arose in the Rhine-Main-Neckar area. The place name in its old spelling "Araheiligon" is mentioned for the first time in an undated interest register of Seligenstadt Abbey, which an unknown scribe probably added to a 9th-century gospel book of the monastery around the year 1000.

The Thirty Years' War shook Arheilgen hard. As early as 1622, the troops of Count von Mansfeld robbed all the houses and the church. In January 1635, the village was almost completely burned down by French troops. Only a few houses remained. The surviving residents fled behind the supposedly safe walls of nearby Darmstadt, where many of them died of the plague. At the end of the war in 1648, only about 12 families were left to rebuild the community.

The chemical element Darmstadtium (atomic number 110) is named after Darmstadt, having been synthetisized in the GSI Helmholtz Centre for Heavy Ion Research in Darmstadt-Arheilgen.

Seal and coat of arms
The coat of arms of the town developed from the court seal, the oldest surviving impression of which dates from 1636. The upper half shows the half figure of Saint Kilian, patron saint of the Franks, to whom the original Arheilgen church was dedicated. Beneath it are lying glasses, a Wolfsangel and two hexagonal stars. The origin of these symbols is still unclear.

Economy
South of Arheilgen is the site of the world's oldest pharmaceutical and chemical company, Merck KGaA. The company is the largest employer in the region and supports both schools and clubs there. In agriculture, asparagus cultivation dominates.

Station Darmstadt-Arheilgen

Darmstadt-Arheilgen has a Railway platform station. The Station is part of the Main-Neckar Railway and was opened in 1848. The  Darmstadt-Arheilgen is station number 1130 and is part of the S3 (Rhine-Main S-Bahn) system.

Trams and buses

Darmstadt started in 1886 with a steam tram system, that later evolved (with a short period of also including trolleybuses from 1944 to 1963) into a 36.2 km network by 2001. From 1890 a steam tram service between Darmstadt and Arheilgen was continually working. Darmstadt had not scrapped this comparatively extensive network after World War II as many other cities did, though some links were decommissioned in the 1960s and 1970s and replaced by bus lines of which the city also has an extensive network.

Tram lines 6,7 and 8 service Darmstadt-Arheilgen. The central nodal point of the Darmstadt tramway network is the Luisenplatz in the city center of Darmstadt. Buses: Bus WX and 662 also serve Arheilgen. The freeways A5 and 67 are to the west of town. The main roads through the town are B3 in north–south direction and B26 in west–east direction.

Boroughs of Darmstadt
Darmstadt has 9 official 'Stadtteile' (boroughs). These are, alphabetically:

Darmstadt-Arheilgen
Darmstadt-Bessungen
Darmstadt-Eberstadt
Darmstadt-Kranichstein
Darmstadt-Mitte ('Central')
Darmstadt-Nord ('North')
Darmstadt-Ost ('East')
Darmstadt-West ('West')
Darmstadt-Wixhausen

See also
SG Arheilgen: football club in Darmstadt-Arheilgen.
FCA Darmstadt: football club in Darmstadt-Arheilgen.
Darmstadt-Kranichstein Railway Museum

References

External links

 Official website of the city of Darmstadt (German and parts in English)
Map of the City of Darmstadt-Arheilgen, with bus and tram stops

Arheilgen
Merck Group